The Alfred P. Sloan Jr. Prize was a $250,000
award given by the General Motors Cancer Research Foundation for outstanding oncological research.

The prize was awarded annually from 1979 to 2005. Of the winners, 15 out of 37 have gone on to win either a Nobel Prize in Physiology or Medicine or a Nobel Prize in Chemistry.

in 2006, due to budget constraints, the Alfred P. Sloan Jr. prize, the Charles K. Kettering prize, and the Charles S. Mott Prize were consolidated into a single General Motors Cancer Research Award which also had a value of $250,000.
The first and only winner of the General Motors Cancer Research Award was Napoleone Ferrara.

After 2006 no more prizes were awarded.

Laureates

See also

 List of medicine awards

References 

American science and technology awards
Cancer research awards